Cary Lawn is a historic mansion in Dresden, Tennessee, USA.

History
The mansion was completed in 1923. It was built for Rhea Preston Cary and his wife, Charlie Ewing.

It was purchased by Ned McWherter in 1984. McWherter went on to serve as the 46th Governor of Tennessee from 1987 to 1995.

Architectural significance
It has been listed on the National Register of Historic Places since June 18, 1992.

References

Houses on the National Register of Historic Places in Tennessee
Renaissance Revival architecture in Tennessee
Houses completed in 1923
Houses in Weakley County, Tennessee
National Register of Historic Places in Weakley County, Tennessee